Marquis of Minas may refer to:

Dom , the first Marquês das Minas
António Luís de Sousa, 2nd Marquis of Minas, Portuguese general and governor-general of the Portuguese colony of Brazil
João de Sousa, 3rd Marquis of Minas